The Denver Winter Olympics Referendum was held in 1972 following the awarding to Denver of the 1976 Winter Olympics.

The selection process for the 1976 Winter Olympics consisted of four bids, and saw Denver, Colorado, United States, selected ahead of Sion, Switzerland; Tampere, Finland; and Vancouver, British Columbia, Canada. The selection was made at the 70th IOC Session in Amsterdam on 12 May 1970. In a 1972 referendum, voters in Colorado rejected funding for the Olympics, and for the only time a city awarded the Olympics rejected them. Denver officially withdrew on 15 November, and the IOC then offered the Olympics to Whistler, British Columbia, Canada, but they too declined owing to a change of government following elections.  Whistler would go on to be associated with neighbouring Vancouver's successful bid for the 2010 Winter Olympics.

Sion was a runner-up also declined. Salt Lake City, Utah offered to host the Olympics, but the IOC, still reeling from the Denver rejection, declined and selected Innsbruck to host the 1976 Winter Olympics, which had hosted the 1964 Winter Olympics twelve years earlier, on 5 February 1973. Salt Lake City would later host the 2002 Winter Olympics.

Contents 
The amendment appeared on the ballot as:

Aftermath
Richard Lamm was an obscure state legislator from Denver when he led the campaign; after the referendum he was elected to three terms as governor, serving from 1975 to 1987.

Within three months, Innsbruck, Austria was selected as the replacement city, hosting the Winter Olympics for the second time, Innsbruck, Austria would be selected as the replacement city, hosting the Winter Olympics for the second time after 1964.

See also
 List of Colorado ballot measures

References

1972 Colorado ballot measures
Constitution of Colorado